St George's British International School is an independent, not-for-profit  international school located in Rome, Italy. It was founded in 1958 to serve Rome's British, international and expatriate communities, and today educates more than 900 children from over 80 countries. The main campus, containing Junior and Senior Schools, is based in La Storta in the northern outskirts of the city. A second campus, located in central Rome, serves Junior School students up to the age of 11.

History
Originally named The English School, the school was founded in 1958 and is an independent, not-for-profit HMC school owned by an association made up of parents of the school. 

The School became known as St George's English School and located to Via Salaria in 1961, before locating to its current premises in 1968. 

In 2002, the school opened a second campus, located in the central Nomentana neighbourhood of Rome. In 2017, the City Centre campus located to a new purpose-fitted campus close to the Vatican in the Aurelio neighbourhood.

The school is a founding member of the Council of British International Schools.

School profile
The school follows an enhanced version of the National Curriculum for England, culminating in IGCSE examinations at the end of Year 11. In the Sixth Form, pupils follow the International Baccalaureate Diploma Programme with examinations sat at the end of Year 13. The majority of graduating students pursue higher education in the United Kingdom, with others applying to universities in the United States, Canada, Australia, The Netherlands and Italy. 

The school's average IB Diploma score in 2020 was 37 points, placing it sixth amongst IB schools in continental Europe.

The school maintains an inclusive and non-academically selective admissions policy, with priority given to families relocating from outside of Italy. The school has an extensive Additional Educational Needs Department to support students with individual learning needs.

Foreign languages offered within the school curriculum include Italian, French, German, Spanish, Latin and Mandarin.

Co-curricular activities
The school was renowned for its creative and performing arts provision, with the school's multiple orchestras and choirs often performing to outside audiences. The school has a number of boys and girls sports teams for various age groups which regularly compete against other teams and schools, including in Rugby, Football and Basketball. Other sports offered include Hockey, Volleyball, Athletics, Swimming, Sailing, Table Tennis, Cricket, Rounders and Gymnastics.

Other after-school clubs include Chess, Coding, GTV, student newspaper, enterprise, cooking, arts, archaeology, film-making, computer programming and astronomy.

Charity
The Zambian Orphans Appeal (ZOA) is a charity established and maintained by St George's, raising funds to maintain the running of an orphanage in Serenje known as the 'Serenje Orphans Children's Home' (SOCH). Every two years, students and teachers from St George's visit the orphanage to undertake projects in support of the orphanage.

Uniform
Junior School students wear a blue and white striped shirt with navy-blue trousers/skirts. School jumpers are allowed. Senior School students wear a blue polo shirt with the school logo, a navy blue jumper, fleece, or sweater with school logo, and navy blue trousers/skirts. The Sixth Form students, whilst not required to wear uniform, adhere to a smart dress-code.

Notable alumni
 Alessandro Borghese - Italian author and television personality
 Alessandro Gassmann - Italian actor
 Andrea Guerra - Italian Executive Chairman, Eataly
 Eddie Cheever - American motor racer
 Frans Timmermans - Dutch politician
 Giovanna Melandri - Italian former politician, President of MAXXI
 Ilaria Capua - Italian virologist and former politician
 John Paul Getty III - American grandson of oil tycoon J. Paul Getty
 Karen King-Aribisala - Nigerian novelist
 Luca Paganini - Italian professional footballer
 Marcantonio M. Spada - Italian-British academic psychologist
 Romano Floriani Mussolini - Italian professional footballer and great grandson of Italian politician Benito Mussolini
 Taryn Power - American actress
 Tiziana Rossetto - Italian earth scientist
 Violante Placido - Italian singer and actress

References

External links
 Official website

British international schools in Italy
International Baccalaureate schools in Italy
International schools in Rome
Educational institutions established in 1958
Secondary schools in Italy
1958 establishments in Italy